Chaminade College Preparatory is a private Catholic preparatory school with two campuses in San Fernando Valley, Los Angeles County, California. 

Named after Society of Mary founder Blessed William Joseph Chaminade, Chaminade College Preparatory consists of a middle school (encompassing grades 6–8) located in Chatsworth and a high school (encompassing grades 9–12) located in West Hills.  It is located in the Roman Catholic Archdiocese of Los Angeles. It is a member of the approved Secondary Schools of the University of California.

Chaminade College Preparatory was recognized as a National Blue Ribbon School in 1998.

History
Originally called Chaminade High School for Boys, Chaminade College Preparatory was founded in 1952 on the former site of the Pacific Military Academy in West Los Angeles by members of the Marianist Province of the Pacific, who were seeking to expand their educational mission into Southern California.  The school became nationally famous for the celebrity students who attended the school or came to its dances. The school's mascot name, the Eagles, can be traced to a tower at the school that featured an imposing Army Eagle emblem in tile, with the beak pointed toward the arrows as in wartime.

The high school moved to its current location in West Hills (then part of Canoga Park) in 1961 after the brick buildings of the original campus were deemed unsound.  A junior high school serving grades seven to nine was formed in 1967 when the former St. John's Military Academy in Chatsworth was leased by the school, expanding Chaminade's educational program from three to six years.  A seventh year was added in 1989 with the addition of a sixth-grade class to the junior high school; the ninth grade was moved to the high school campus that same year to accommodate the addition of the sixth grade to the junior high school, which would then become the middle school.

The school became co-educational in 1972, with the first female graduates in the Class of 1974.  Chaminade's two campuses served as the primary locations for the 1976 film The Pom Pom Girls.

Academics

Grading
The school year is divided into two semesters and classes meet every other day for 87 minutes. Since the pandemic, however, classes meet for 80 minutes with a simplified block schedule. During the 2020–2021 school year, classes met for 50 minutes via Microsoft Teams or Zoom. Chaminade issues
three progress grade reports per semester; however, only semester grades appear on the student's permanent record
at the end of each semester, in January and in June. It uses a 4.0 grading scale as follows: A = 90–100, B = 80–89, C = 70–79,
D = 60–69, and F = 0–59.

Advanced Placement & HonorsThere are a total of 23 Advanced Placement and 18 Honors courses offered. In order to maintain a balanced course
load, students are not allowed to take more than nine year-long AP courses: two in tenth grade, three in 11th grade and four in 12th grade. In 2014, 473 Chaminade students took 911 AP examinations. Of the total exams taken 17% were a perfect score of five, 22% were a score of four, and 24% were a score of three. With a score of three or higher, students may earn credit at many colleges and universities, it is also considered a passing score.

Athletic achievements
In 1997, the Chaminade varsity girls' soccer team won its first of four consecutive CIF Championships.

In 1998, the boys' basketball team won its first of two consecutive CIF Championships.

In 2006, the girls' varsity softball team won its first of two consecutive CIF Championships.

In 2006, the varsity lacrosse team won its first CIF Championship.

In 2010, the boys' golf team won CIF.

In 2013, the girls' soccer team won the CIF Southern Section Division I

In 2013, a Chaminade equestrian rode into second place at the Interscholastic Equestrian League.

In 2013, the boys' varsity Football team won the CIF Championship, CIF Regional Championship and CIF State Championship.

In 2014, the boys' varsity basketball team won the CIF state championship.3rd State Crown this season.

In 2014, the boys' varsity fencing team won the California State High School Fencing Championships.

In 2014, the Chaminade wrestling team won four medals at the Mission League Finals. first, second, third, and fourth place.

In 2015, the girls' basketball team won the CIF Southern Section Open Division championship.

In 2015, the men's combined fencing team won the State Championship.

In 2014, a column by Los Angeles Times reporter Eric Sondheimer identified Chaminade as one of a number of elite prep schools contributing to the professionalization of high-school sports. Noting that coaches at these schools are hired and fired based on their win–loss records, and that the schools' administrations rely heavily on transfer students to stack athletic teams with all-star players, Sondheimer concluded that if Chaminade's practices are the "new normal," then, "the original mission of high school sports is headed for extinction."

Sexual abuse allegations
In 2013, five Catholic orders released the confidential personnel files of a dozen priests and nuns accused of sexually abusing minors throughout previous decades. The files revealed that priest Joseph DiPeri was accused of molesting a student at Chaminade High School in 1977–78. The school's administration was informed at the time, but no further action was taken. A letter from a Los Angeles police detective in the file noted that, "There was no mandatory reporting at the time of the alleged incident."

The files also included sexual-abuse allegations from 1973 to 1974 against Charles George Fatooh, who worked at both Chaminade's high school and middle school campuses. Fatooh was voted Teacher of the Year in 1975, and became principal of Chaminade Middle School in 1979.

In August, 2017, an unnamed teacher was placed on leave after school officials sent a letter home to parents informing them of "credible evidence" that inappropriate physical conduct between the teacher and student(s) had taken place. Chaminade did not name the teacher in the letter to parents, or in any other public statements.

School officials said they hired an independent investigator to review the case. According to local news, a parent whose son was in the teacher's class said, "He seemed like such a nice guy, was really good to my son who just got out of the hospital so it's a bummer." The Los Angeles Police Department confirmed an open investigation into the allegations. The school also received criticism from alumni for their refusal to name the teacher in question.

During the 2018–19 school year at Chaminade High School a (teaching) brother was accused of sending explicit images to a minor. [17] The brother had been with the school since 2017 and was well known on both Chaminade campuses, serving in masses and participating in many other school-related activities. He was removed from the West Hills Marianist Community.

Notable alumni

 Rick Bassman (1970s) – entrepreneur, producer, talent agent, and author
 Brett Erlich (2000) – co-host of Current TV's InfoMania
 Melissa Francis (1991) – Fox News reporter/host
 Laura Frankos-Turtledove (1977) – author
 David Gallagher (2003) – actor
 Missy Gold (1988) – actor
 Tracey Gold (1987) – actor
 Ryan Griffin (2008) – Tampa Bay Buccaneers quarterback
 Paige Hemmis (1990) – actor
 Linda Hogan nee Claridge (1977) – reality TV star, ex-wife of wrestler Hulk Hogan
 Ron Insana (1979) – financial journalist / analyst (CNBC and syndicated)
 Brad Kaaya (2014) - Carolina Panthers, Detroit Lions quarterback
 John Longenecker (1965) – cinematographer and Academy Award winner
 Shelley Lubben (1986) – pornographic actress and activist
 Laura Marano (2014) – actress and star of Austin & Ally
 Mary Elizabeth McDonough (1979) – actress (The Waltons, The New Adventures of Old Christine)
 Marc Merrill (1998) – founder and chairman of Riot Games
 Beverley Mitchell (1999) – actor
 David Paich (1972) – keyboardist (Toto, Boz Scaggs) and composer / lyricist ("Rosanna", "Africa", "Lowdown", "Lido Shuffle")
 Logan Paulsen (2005) – Washington Redskins tight end
 Sydney Penny (1989) – actor
 Kevin Pillar (2007) – Toronto Blue Jays, San Francisco Giants, Boston Red Sox, Colorado Rockies outfielder
 Joseph Rohde (1973) – Disney executive, lead designer of Disney's Animal Kingdom
 Dan Runzler (2003) – San Francisco Giants pitcher
 Blake Rutherford (2016) – Chicago White Sox first baseman and outfielder
 Jonathan Taylor Thomas (2000) – actor
 Chris Turner (2005) – University of Maryland quarterback
 Anna Webber (2004) – photographer
 Dean Ween (1987) – lead guitarist of Ween

References

External links
 

High schools in the San Fernando Valley
Catholic preparatory schools in California
Roman Catholic secondary schools in Los Angeles County, California
Educational institutions established in 1952
1952 establishments in California
Chatsworth, Los Angeles
West Hills, Los Angeles
Marianist schools
Catholic secondary schools in California